Ophonus phoenix is a species of ground beetle in the subfamily Harpalinae, genus Ophonus, and subgenus Ophonus (Macrophonus).

References

phoenix
Beetles described in 1902